Gildford is an unincorporated community and census-designated place (CDP) in Hill County, Montana, United States. The population was 179 at the 2010 census.

The town was named for Guildford, England. A flour mill, which milled Golden Grain Flour, operated from 1915 to 1951.

Geography

Gildford is located in west-central Hill County at  (48.569785, -110.297115). U.S. Route 2 passes along the southern edge of the community, leading east  to Havre, the county seat, and west  to Shelby.

School 
Historically Gildford had an independent public school district, but consolidated with Kremlin to form the K-G School District in 1971. At that time the junior and senior high schools were located in Gildford. Further consolidation occurred in advance of the 2005-06 school year when the K-G School District consolidated with the neighboring Blue Sky School District, forming the North Star Public School District (Districts 99 and M). With this most recent merger, the elementary school is located in Gildford. The junior and senior high schools are now located in Rudyard, Montana.  The current mascot for North Star Public Schools is the Knight, with the school colors being black, royal blue, and white.

Demographics

As of the census of 2000, there were 185 people, 76 households, and 54 families residing in the CDP. The population density was 36.9 people per square mile (14.3/km2). There were 86 housing units at an average density of 17.2 per square mile (6.6/km2). The racial makeup of the CDP was 97.84% White, 1.08% Native American, and 1.08% from two or more races.

There were 76 households, out of which 31.6% had children under the age of 18 living with them, 64.5% were married couples living together, 3.9% had a female householder with no husband present, and 28.9% were non-families. 27.6% of all households were made up of individuals, and 13.2% had someone living alone who was 65 years of age or older. The average household size was 2.43 and the average family size was 2.98.

In the CDP, the population was spread out, with 27.0% under the age of 18, 4.9% from 18 to 24, 25.9% from 25 to 44, 21.1% from 45 to 64, and 21.1% who were 65 years of age or older. The median age was 40 years. For every 100 females, there were 92.7 males. For every 100 females age 18 and over, there were 84.9 males.

The median income for a household in the CDP was $33,125, and the median income for a family was $43,750. Males had a median income of $23,125 versus $28,438 for females. The per capita income for the CDP was $17,648. About 4.4% of families and 4.9% of the population were below the poverty line, including none of those under the age of eighteen and 6.1% of those 65 or over.

References

Census-designated places in Hill County, Montana
Census-designated places in Montana